José María Fernández-Ladreda y Menéndez-Valdés (14 March 1885 – 20 September 1954) was a Spanish general who served as Minister of Public Works of Spain between 1945 and 1951, during the Francoist dictatorship.

References

1885 births
1954 deaths
Public works ministers of Spain
Government ministers during the Francoist dictatorship